Lynn Allen (February 27, 1891 – May 31, 1958) was an American football wingback who played one season in the American Professional Football Association with the Detroit Heralds. He played college football at the University of Detroit.

External links
Just Sports Stats

1891 births
1958 deaths
Players of American football from Michigan
American football running backs
Detroit Titans football players
Detroit Heralds players
People from Chelsea, Michigan